The Confessionals is a group of anonymous forums maintained by Shibo Xu, an Oberlin College graduate, and developed by various short-term collaborators. They provide a space for college and university students to speak openly and candidly, often on taboo subjects. They have become a source for advice but have also generated controversy over the prevalence of anonymous personal attacks.

History
The first confessional created was Oberlin Confessional, created by Harris Lapiroff based on an idea he had had from a similar Livejournal community. This original confessional gained in popularity until its creator left, after which Shibo assumed control of the site.

Controversy
When introduced to a college, the confessional often generates a lot of controversy, particularly if it has become a source for anonymous personal attacks. Using the names of others is strictly prohibited under the terms and conditions of the confessional, but names often appear in violation of these rules. Although these confessions are usually removed from the site, they have the ability to do considerable damage while they remain visible. As such, many college administrations have spoken out forcefully against them, but are usually unable to do more without being accused of censorship.

Some critics seriously question whether anonymous attacks against individuals qualifies as protected "free speech". Some critics, including prominent legislators, are taking a close look at the degree to which an institution such as a college may be liable for continued inaction in regard to confessional sites linked to their institutions.

Confessionals
There are currently confessionals for ten different colleges and universities:

 Oberlin College
 Middlebury College
 Amherst College
 Mount Holyoke College
 Connecticut College
 Smith College
 University of Massachusetts
 Cornell University
 Iowa State University

In addition to these, Shibo created a joint confessional, open to the public, for summer 2008. The summer confessional was bought back again for summer 2011 and 2014.

The site also expanded to neighborhoods in August 2014 with the launch of the Dumbo Confessional.

References

External links
 Mount Holyoke Confessional
 Smith Confessional

Free speech activists
Internet forums